Ballymartle GAA (CLG Baile an Mhairtealaigh) is a Gaelic Athletic Association club based in the village of Riverstick in County Cork, Ireland. The club fields both Gaelic football and hurling teams in competitions organized by Cork County Board. The club is part of the Carrigdhoun division of Cork.
The club has achieved most of its success in hurling.

At Underage they come together with fellow neighbours Belgooly to form Sliabh Rua who were White and Maroon Colours.

Achievements
 All-Ireland Intermediate Club Hurling Championship Winners (1) 2011
 Munster Intermediate Club Hurling Championship Winners (1) 2010
 Cork Premier Senior Hurling Championship (0) Runners Up 1906 
 Cork Premier Intermediate Hurling Championship Winners (1) 2010 Runners-Up 2009
 Cork Intermediate A Hurling Championship Winners (1) 2006  Runners Up 1954
 Cork Junior Hurling Championship Winners (3) 1952, 1958, 1986  Runners-Up 1936, 1975
 Carrigdhoun Junior Hurling Championship Winners (15) 1936, 1939, 1940, 1943, 1951, 1952, 1958, 1972, 1975, 1976, 1985, 1986, 2008, 2010, 2015, 2021  Runners-Up 1926, 1942, 1950, 1970, 1971, 1973, 1980, 1983, 1984, 2006, 2007, 2013, 2014, 2022
 Carrigdhoun Junior Football Championship Winners (1) 2018 Runners-Up 2019, 2020 
 Cork Senior Hurling League (0) Runners-Up 1906, 2019
 Cork Intermediate Hurling League Winners (2) 1995, 2010, 2009
 Cork Premier 2 Minor Hurling Championship (0) Runners-Up 2021 (with Belgooly)
 South-East Under 21 "A" Hurling Championship Winners (7) 1967, 1981, 1989, 1992, 2008, 2010, 2012
 South-East Under 21 "A" Football Championship Winners (1) 2009
 South-East Under 21 "B" Football Championship Winners (2) 1995, 2012, 2022

Notable players
 Brian Corry
 Darren McCarthy
Bobby O'Regan
Rikard Cahalane
Denis "Denny" Barry
John O'Mahony - 1990 All-ireland senior winner
John Deasy

References

External sources
 List of Cork Senior Football Champions 
 List of Cork Intermediate Football Champions
 Hogan Stand list of Cork Champions
 Cork GAA results archive page
 Ballymartle GAA website - History (archived)

Gaelic games clubs in County Cork
Gaelic football clubs in County Cork
Hurling clubs in County Cork